Oh Seung-hoon (born 11 February 1991) is a  South Korean actor and model. He gained attention and acclaim for his role in the film Method (2017). He was also known for portraying a hired killer of the main antagonist from 2017 TV series Innocent Defendant.

Filmography

Film

Television series

Awards and nominations

References

External links 
 
 
 

1991 births
Living people
South Korean male television actors
South Korean male film actors